The Intercontinental GT Challenge is a sports car racing series developed by the SRO Group in 2016. It consists of international endurance races for grand tourer racing cars complying with the FIA's GT3 regulations.

Format
The series is aimed at manufacturers. Instead of fielding their own cars, manufacturers can appoint and support local teams in selected events to gain points. Four manufacturers took part in the inaugural series in 2016: Audi, Bentley, McLaren and Mercedes.

The races may be stand-alone events, like the Suzuka 10 Hours, (which the event are organized by GT Association, Super GT race promoter) and the Bathurst 12 Hour (the event are organized by Supercars Events), or part of another championship (like the 24 Hours of Spa, Indianapolis 8 Hour and Kyalami 9 Hours) but they are all contested by cars complying with the same technical regulations.

Champions
The title is awarded to the manufacturer with the highest points tally. A manufacturer can enter up to four cars in any event but only receives points for its two highest placed cars. Drivers’ titles are awarded in the Pro category and the Am category for drivers that a rated bronze by the FIA's ranking system.

Manufacturers' championship

Drivers' championship

See also
 Bathurst 12 Hour
 24 Hours of Spa
 Sepang 12 Hours
 Suzuka 10 Hours
 California 8 Hours
 Kyalami 9 Hours
Indianapolis 8 Hour
Gulf 12 Hours

References

External links

Sports car racing series
Group GT3